Guamba is an album by American jazz bassist Gary Peacock, with saxophonist Jan Garbarek, trumpeter Palle Mikkelborg, and drummer Peter Erskine, recorded in 1987 and released on the ECM label.

Reception
The Allmusic review by Ron Wynn awarded the album 4 stars stating "Good late '80s session... The only defect comes from ECM's occasional tendency to introduce New Age themes and production values into the mix".

Track listing
All compositions by Gary Peacock except as indicated
 "Guamba" - 3:09 
 "Requiem" - 7:10 
 "Celina" - 4:13 
 "Thyme Time" (Peter Erskine, Gary Peacock) - 5:25 
 "Lila" - 13:04 
 "Introending" - 3:43 
 "Gardenia" - 8:07 
Recorded at Rainbow Studio in Oslo, Norway in March 1987.

Personnel
 Gary Peacock — bass
 Jan Garbarek — tenor saxophone, soprano saxophone
 Palle Mikkelborg — trumpet, flugelhorn
 Peter Erskine — drums

References

ECM Records albums
Gary Peacock albums
1987 albums
Albums produced by Manfred Eicher